The EEL ULF 1 is a West German high-wing, single-seat, foot-launched, microlift glider that was designed by Dieter Reich. When it was available it was provided in the form of plans by Entwicklung und Erprobung von Leichtflugzeugen (EEL) for amateur construction. By the end of 2019 the company website had been take down and it is likely that the company has gone out of business.

Design and development
The ULF 1 was first flown in November 1977 and first shown at the 3rd International Hang Glider Meet at the Wasserkuppe in August 1978. The prototype was built by Reich's partner at EEL, Heiner Neumann. The design was intended to be able to soar in weak ridge and thermal lift.

The aircraft is made from spruce, birch plywood and balsa, covered in doped aircraft fabric and features conventional full three axis controls. Its two-piece, single-spar  span wing is a cantilever design and employs a Wortmann FX 63-137 airfoil. Glide path control is via spoilers on the wing top surface. The aircraft is normally flown without a windshield, but a Plexiglas canopy is optional. With both the canopy and pilot doors fitted the best glide ratio is 18:1. The landing gear is a fixed skid and the aircraft is equipped with a ballistic parachute full aircraft rescue system. The aircraft is normally transported by trailer and can be assembled in 10 minutes.

The ULF 1 was approved in West Germany in July 1980 and Australia in 1983.

The ULF 1 can be foot-launched from slopes of at least 15°. The pilot foot launches the aircraft suspending it on the shoulder harness and, once airborne sits on a retractable slat seat and closes two partial lower doors. It can also be launched by bungee launch, winch-launch, auto-tow and aerotow.

The cost of building the aircraft from plans is estimated by the designer as €2500. In 2011 the plans cost €150 and were available in German and English. The plans consist of 31 blueprint pages and a 37-page construction manual. The manufacturer claims a build time of about 1000 hours.

Operational history
The prototype has flown more than 200 flights totalling over 150 hours, most of which were foot-launched.

More than 40 examples have been completed and flown.

Specifications (ULF 1)

See also

References

External links

1970s German sailplanes
Sailplanes designed for foot-launching
Homebuilt aircraft
Entwicklung und Erprobung von Leichtflugzeugen aircraft
Aircraft first flown in 1977